Dale Lavelle Carter (born November 28, 1969) is a former American football cornerback in the National Football League (NFL). He played for the Kansas City Chiefs, Denver Broncos, Minnesota Vikings, New Orleans Saints, and Baltimore Ravens.

Professional career

Carter was drafted as a cornerback by the Chiefs in the 1992 NFL Draft out of the University of Tennessee.

In 1992, Carter was named the NFL Defensive Rookie of the Year.  On Thanksgiving Day (November 23, 1995), Carter was ejected for kicking Michael Irvin of the Dallas Cowboys in a 24-12 loss at Texas Stadium.

After six seasons in Kansas City in which he shined on the field, but had numerous off-the-field problems, Carter signed a four-year, $22.8 million contract with the Broncos in 1999, making him the NFL's highest-paid defensive back. After a poor year, Carter was suspended for the entire 2000 season due to a fourth substance abuse violation before being released during the 2001 season. He then played for the Vikings, Saints, he missed the entire 2004 season due to a blood clot in his lung and then played for the Ravens before retiring after the 2005 season.

NFL statistics

Personal life
Carter is the brother of Jake Reed, former wide receiver who played most notably for the Minnesota Vikings, father of current Seattle Seahawks defensive back Nigel Warrior, and the uncle of defensive back J.R. Reed.

References

1969 births
Living people
People from Covington, Georgia
Sportspeople from the Atlanta metropolitan area
Players of American football from Georgia (U.S. state)
American football cornerbacks
Tennessee Volunteers football players
All-American college football players
Kansas City Chiefs players
Denver Broncos players
Minnesota Vikings players
New Orleans Saints players
Baltimore Ravens players
National Football League Defensive Rookie of the Year Award winners
American Conference Pro Bowl players
Ed Block Courage Award recipients